The 1983 NCAA Division I Field Hockey Championship was the third women's collegiate field hockey tournament organized by the National Collegiate Athletic Association, to determine the top college field hockey team in the United States. The Old Dominion Lady Monarchs won their second consecutive championship, defeating the Connecticut Huskies in the final for the second year in a row.

Bracket

References 

NCAA Division I Field Hockey Championship
Field Hockey
NCAA